Tuomo Sakari Ylipulli (3 March 1965 – 23 July 2021) was a Finnish ski jumper.

Career
Tuomo Ylipulli won a gold medal in the Team large hill competition at the 1988 Winter Olympics in Calgary. His biggest successes were in the Team large hill event at the FIS Nordic World Ski Championships, where he won two gold medals (1985, 1987). He was the brother of Nordic combined skier Jukka Ylipulli and fellow ski jumpers Raimo Ylipulli and Heikki Ylipulli.

World Cup

Standings

Wins

See also
List of Olympic medalist families

References

External links
 
 

1965 births
2021 deaths
People from Rovaniemi
Finnish male ski jumpers
Ski jumpers at the 1988 Winter Olympics
Olympic medalists in ski jumping
FIS Nordic World Ski Championships medalists in ski jumping
Medalists at the 1988 Winter Olympics
Olympic gold medalists for Finland
Sportspeople from Lapland (Finland)